
Gmina Opatowiec is a rural gmina (administrative district) in Kazimierza County, Świętokrzyskie Voivodeship, in south-central Poland.

The gmina contains part of the protected area called Nida Landscape Park.

Villages
Gmina Opatowiec contains the villages and settlements of Charbinowice, Chrustowice, Chwalibogowice, Kamienna, Kęsów, Kobiela, Kocina, Kraśniów, Krzczonów, Ksany, Ławy, Mistrzowice, Opatowiec, Podskale, Rogów, Rzemienowice, Senisławice, Trębaczów, Urzuty and Wyszogród.

Neighbouring gminas
Gmina Opatowiec is bordered by the gminas of Bejsce, Czarnocin, Gręboszów, Kazimierza Wielka, Koszyce, Nowy Korczyn, Wietrzychowice and Wiślica.

References
Polish official population figures 2006

Opatowiec
Kazimierza County